Robert K. Bing (born July 8, 1930) was an American politician and lawyer who served as the 33rd Mayor of Burlington, Vermont.

Life

On July 8, 1930 Robert K. Bing was born to Katherine Ryan Seaver and Chester K. Bing in Colchester, Vermont. In 1948, Bing graduated from Montpelier High School and then served in the navy for one year. In 1952 he married Geraldine Johnson. In 1953, Bing  graduated from the University of Vermont and in 1956 he graduated from Yale Law School. In October 1956, Bing was admitted to Vermont's bar and became District Court Judge Ernest W. Gibson Jr.'s law secretary. In 1958, he was the Republican nominee for Chittenden County state's attorney, but was defeated. In 1960, Bing was selected as one of thirty alternate delegates to the Vermont Republican state convention.

On February 13, 1961 the Republican city committee gave Bing the nomination for mayor and on March 7 he defeated incumbent Democratic Mayor James E. Fitzpatrick with 4,953 votes to 4,024 votes and every ward except for Ward 4-1, despite having never held an elected office nor being involved in city politics prior to the mayoral race. During Bing's tenure, he supported the city government using a strong-mayor system rather than a weak-mayor system. He later announced that he would not seek reelection and endorsed Alderman Edward A. Keenan. 

In 1965, Bing was appointed as wing commander for the Vermont Wing Civil Air Patrol. In 1969 he was elected as president of the Vermont Bar Association and Governor Deane C. Davis appointed him as executive director of the Commission on Crime Control and Prevention and served until his resignation in 1971. In 1971, Bing was the campaign manager of Frank Dion's unsuccessful mayoral campaign, Dion had been his campaign manager in 1961, against Gordon Paquette. In 1993, he congratulated Peter C. Brownell for his upset victory against Peter Clavelle in the mayoral race.

References

1930 births
Mayors of Burlington, Vermont
Vermont Republicans
20th-century American politicians
Living people